The 2007 Babergh District Council election was held on 3 May 2007 to elect members to the council. The Conservative Party replaced the Liberal Democrats as the largest party but the council stayed under no overall control. The Labour Party lost all of its six seats. The number of Independents remained the same

Election result

|}

2 Conservative and 2 Independent candidates were unopposed.

Ward results

External links
 2007 Babergh election result

2007 English local elections
2007
2000s in Suffolk